Toroli (Tóról) is a village and seat of the commune of Dougoutene I in the Cercle of Koro in the Mopti Region of southern-central Mali. Togo kan is spoken in Toroli. There is a weekly Monday regional market in Toroli.

References

Populated places in Mopti Region